Chain Leader was a trade publication and web site owned by Reed Business Information serving the information needs of owners and operators of full, fast-casual, and quick service chain restaurants.

The editor-in-chief was Mary Boltz Chapman; the editorial offices were located in Oak Brook, Illinois, USA.
 
Established in 1997, Chain Leader was published monthly. Common topics included menu development, expansion, operations and branding.

In October, Chain Leader hosted an event called Chain Leader LIVE, where successful restaurant chains provide other attendees with their business insights and strategies.

As of December 2006, total BPA audited circulation was 16,149 subscribers.

References
BPA Worldwide

External links
Chain Leader website

Business magazines published in the United States
Defunct magazines published in the United States
Magazines established in 1997
Magazines disestablished in 2010
Magazines published in Illinois
Professional and trade magazines